The Wassillie Trefon Dena'ina Fish Cache is a historically important fish cache (backcountry food storage structure) that is now listed on the National Register of Historic Places. It qualified for this designation partly because it was a uniquely well-preserved example of traditional Dena'ina Athabascan fish-caching buildings in the vicinity of Lakes Clark and Iliamna. It was built without nails or spikes.

The cache was originally built in about 1920 at a location on Miller Creek and has been moved several times;  it is now located near the Lake Clark National Park and Preserve's visitor center.

See also
National Register of Historic Places listings in Lake and Peninsula Borough, Alaska
National Register of Historic Places listings in Lake Clark National Park and Preserve

References 

Buildings and structures completed in 1920
Buildings and structures in Lake and Peninsula Borough, Alaska
Agricultural buildings and structures on the National Register of Historic Places
Agricultural buildings and structures on the National Register of Historic Places in Alaska
National Register of Historic Places in Lake Clark National Park and Preserve
Buildings and structures on the National Register of Historic Places in Lake and Peninsula Borough, Alaska
1920 establishments in Alaska